The M1867 Werndl–Holub was a single-shot breechloading rifle adopted by the Austro-Hungarian army on 28 July 1867. It replaced the Wänzl breechloader conversion of the muzzle-loading Lorenz rifle. Josef Werndl (1831–1889) and Karel Holub (1830–1903) designed and patented their rifle; Werndl later bought out all the rights, but was involved in name only.

ÖWG (Österreichische Waffenfabriksgesellschaft) produced the Werndl and chambered it for the 11mm scharfe Patrone M.67 (11.15×42mmR) cartridge. In 1877, the military rechambered the Werndl for the bottleneck 11mm scharfe Patrone M.77 (11.15×58mmR) cartridge.

Production
In 1867, the army ordered 611,000 of the new rifles. The first batch of 100,000 rifles cost 5 million florins, or 50 florins per rifle. The army received 14 million florins in funding to acquire Werndl rifles and ammunition in 1868. The budget was then cut to just 1 million in 1869. As a result, by November 1870, only 316,650 Werndl breechloaders had been produced and the army still needed an additional 302,810 rifles to fulfill the needs of the regular troops, without taking into account the demands of the Imperial-Royal Landwehr and the Royal Hungarian Honvéd. In February 1873, the war minister Franz Kuhn von Kuhnenfeld stated a need for 370,000 more Werndl rifles for the army.

Use
In spite of the Werndl being long obsolete by World War I, the Austro-Hungarian forces issued Werndl rifles to rear-echelon units to free up more modern rifles for use by front-line troops.

Comparison with contemporary rifles

Users
Afghanistan
Principality of Albania
Austria-Hungary
Argentina (limited use) 
Czechoslovakia
Ethiopian Empire
Montenegro
Persia
Polish Legions in World War I
Poland
Ukrainian Sich Riflemen
Kingdom of Yugoslavia
Luxembourg

Conflicts
Paraguayan War(Limited)
Krivošije uprising 1869
Herzegovina uprising 1875–1877
Montenegrin–Ottoman War 1876–78
Austro-Hungarian campaign in Bosnia and Herzegovina in 1878
Battles for Plav and Gusinje 1879-1880
Argentine Civil War 1880
Kurdish uprising 1880-1881
Herzegovina uprising 1882
First Italo-Ethiopian War 1894-1896
First Balkan War 1912-1913
Second Balkan War 1913
World War I (limited)
Ukrainian War of Independence 1917-1921 (limited)
Retaking of Czech Borderland 1918-1919 (limited)
Austro-Slovene conflict in Carinthia 1918-1919 (limited)
Revolutions and interventions in Hungary 1918-1920 (limited)
Hungarian–Czechoslovak War 1918-1919 (limited)
Polish–Ukrainian War 1918-1919 (limited)
Silesian Uprisings 1919-1921
Polish–Czechoslovak War 1919 (limited)
Polish–Soviet War 1919-1921 (limited)

See also
 Weaponry of the Austro-Hungarian Empire
 Mannlicher M1886 – the next Austro-Hungarian service rifle

References

External links

Early rifles
Weapons of Austria-Hungary
Single-shot rifles
1867 introductions
Rifles of Austria